Soundalga  is a village located on the Mumbai- Bangalore Highway between Nippani and Kagal in Karnataka, India. It is in the Chikodi taluka of Belgaum district.   Even though it is located on the Karnataka side of Maharashtra-Karnataka border, Marathi is the main language.

Compared to typical villages in India, Soundalga is much more developed with good infrastructure such as concrete/ tar roads, water supply to every house, electricity, bus connectivity being on the highway, school, banks with ATM.

Soundalga has fertile land as one can see the greenery all 12 months while driving on the highway.

It is a hub of high quality and reliable onion seed and onion production due to pioneering efforts taken by Shri Subarao Kulkarni.

It has high literacy and has produced many gold medalists, engineers, doctors, PHDs, other professionals and sport personalities who have excelled at national and international levels. They have been rankers of Pune, Mumbai SSC, HSC board merit lists and working in multinational companies in Hindustan and abroad.
ग्राम दैवत  श्री नरसिंह (नरसोबा) 
ग्राम देवी श्री बनशंकरी देवी(चौंडेश्वरी)
प्रसिद्द देवस्थान : श्री रेणुकामाता
ही येेथिल काही मंदिरे आहेत.

वार्षिक यात्रा : श्री रेणुकामाता भंडारा, रंगपंचमी
श्रावण यात्रा : श्रावण मंगळवार,
त्रै वार्षिक यात्रा : श्री लक्ष्मी येथे साजरेे होतात.
गाव यात्रा व उत्सव प्रिय असे आहे.
सर्व बारा बलुतेदार जातीचे लोक येथे गुण्यागोविंदाने राहतात

Demographics
At the 2001 India census, Soundalga had a population of 6207 with 3155 males and 3052 females.

See also
 Belgaum
 Districts of Karnataka

References

External links
 http://Belgaum.nic.in/

Villages in Belagavi district